This is a list of historical secret police organizations. In most cases they are no longer current because the regime that ran them was overthrown or changed, or they changed their names. Few still exist under the same name as legitimate police forces.

Agencies by country

Afghanistan
Khedamat-e Etelea'at-e Dawlati (KHAD) (Government Intelligence Service), active in the Democratic Republic of Afghanistan

Albania
Sigurimi (Directorate of State Security), active in the People's Socialist Republic of Albania

Algeria
Département du Renseignement et de la Sécurité (Department of Intelligence and Security)

Angola
Directorate of Information and Security of Angola (Direcção de Informação e Segurança de Angola) (DISA), active in the People's Republic of Angola

Argentina
Sección Especial de Represión al Comunismo (SERC) (Special Section for the Repression of Communism)
División de Información Política Antidemocrática (DIPA) (Political Anti-democratic Information Division)

Austria 

 Geheime Staatspolizei (Secret State Police), active in the Austrian Empire

Bolivia
Servicio Especial de Seguridad (SES) (Special Security Service)

Brazil
Departamento de Operações Internas-Centro de Operações de Defesa Interna (DOI-CODI) (Internal Operations Department-Centre for Internal Defence Operations), active during the military dictatorship (1964–1985)

Bulgaria
Komitet za dǎržavna sigurnost (CDS) (The Committee for State Security), most commonly referred to as the State Security, or DS, active in the People's Republic of Bulgaria

Cambodia 
Santebal – secret police during the Khmer Rouge period

Cameroon
Centre National d'Étude et de Recherche (National Centre for Study and Research)

Central African Republic
Force spéciale de défense des institutions républicaines (FORSIDIR) (The Presidential Lifeguard)
Unité de sécurité présidentielle (USP) (Presidential Security Organisation – acted as the main secret organisation before and after FORSIDIR)
Office central de répression du banditisme (OCRB) (Central Office of Banditry Repression)

Chad
Direction de la Documentation et de la Sécurité (DDS) (Directorate of Documentation and Security)

Chile
Dirección de Inteligencia Nacional (DINA) (National Intelligence Directorate), active during the regime of Augusto Pinochet
Central Nacional de Informaciones (CNI) (National Information Centre), active during the regime of Augusto Pinochet

China
Jinyiwei (Ming Dynasty) (1368–1661)
Bureau of Investigation and Statistics (Republic of China) (1938–1946)

Colombia
Administrative Department of Security Departamento Administrativo de Seguridad (DAS) (1960–2011)

Congo, People's Republic of
General Directorate for State Security (French: Direction Générale de la Sécurité de l'État)

Croatia, Independent State of
Ravnateljstvo za javni red i sigurnost (RAVSIGUR) (Directorate for Public Order and Security) / Glavno ravnateljstvo za javni red i sigurnost (GRAVSIGUR) (General Directorate for Public Order and Security) 
Ustaška nadzorna služba (UNS) (Ustaše Surveillance Service)

Cuba
Bureau for the Repression of Communist Activities (Batista government)

Czechoslovakia
Státní bezpečnost / Štátna bezpečnosť (StB / ŠtB) (State Security), active in the Czechoslovak Socialist Republic

Dominican Republic
Servicio Inteligencia Militar (SIM) – Military Intelligence Service under Rafael Trujillo

Egypt
State Security Investigations Service (Mabahith Amn al-Dawla al-'Ulya)

Finland
Etsivä keskuspoliisi (EK) (1919–1937) (transl. "Detecting central police") 
Valtiollinen poliisi (Valpo) (1937–1949) (transl. "State police")

Germany
Preußische Geheimpolizei (Prussian Secret Police) – active in the Kingdom of Prussia, the German Confederation, the North German Confederation, the German Empire and the Weimar Republic; merged in the Gestapo
Geheime Staatspolizei (Gestapo) (Secret State Police) – active in Nazi Germany
Geheime Feldpolizei (Secret Field Police) – The Wehrmacht's version of the Gestapo
SS-Sicherheitsdienst (SS Security Service) – The intelligence agency of the Nazi Party and the SS
Ministerium für Staatssicherheit (MfS or Stasi) (Ministry for State Security) – active in the German Democratic Republic during the Cold War

Greece
Organization for the Protection of the People's Struggle (OPLA)
National Civil Guard 
People's Civil Guard
Greek Military Police, active as a secret police force during the Greek military junta

Guatemala
Cuerpo de Detectives (Detectives Corp
Policía Judicial (Judicial Police)
Policía Militar Ambulate (PMA) (Mobile Military Police)
Guardia de Hacienda (Palace Guard)
Centro de Servicios Especiales de la Presidencia (Centre for Special Presidential Services)

Haiti
Service d'Information  (SD) (Information Service)
Milice de Volontaires de la Sécurité Nationale (MVSN) (Militia of National Security Volunteers, better known as the Tonton Macoutes), active during the Duvalier dynasty

Honduras
Departamento Nacional de Investigaciones (DNI) (National Investigation Department)

Hungary
Államvédelmi Osztály (ÁVO) (State Protection Department)
Államvédelmi Hatóság (ÁVH) (State Protection Authority)

Indonesia
Komando Pemulihan Keamanan dan Ketertiban (Kopkamtib) (Security and Order Restoration Command), active during the regime of Suharto

Iran
Sazeman-i Ettelaat va Amniyat-i Keshvar (SAVAK) (National Organization for Intelligence and Security), active in the Imperial State of Iran

Iraq
 Jihaz Al-Mukhabarat Al-A'ma (Mukhabarat) (Iraqi Intelligence Service), active in Ba'athist Iraq

Ireland
Criminal Investigation Department (CID)

Italy
Organizzazione di Vigilanza Repressione dell'Antifascismo (OVRA) (Organization for Vigilance and Repression of Anti-Fascism), active in Fascist Italy and the Italian Social Republic under the rule of Benito Mussolini

Japan
Tokubetsu Kōtō Keisatsu (Tokkō) (Special Higher Police)
Kenpeitai (Military Police Corps), secret military police of the Imperial Army, later the army and navy
Tokubetsu Keisatsutai (Tokkeitai) (Special Police Corps), secret military police of the Imperial Navy, duties later assumed by the Kenpeitai

South Korea
Korea Central Intelligence Agency (KCIA)
Agency for National Security Planning (ANSP)

Mexico
Dirección Federal de Seguridad (DFS) (Federal Security Directorate)
División de Investigaciones para la Prevención de la Delincuencia (DIPD) (Investigation Division for the Prevention of Delinquency)

Mongolia
Dotood Yam (Ministry of Internal Affairs), active in the Mongolian People's Republic

Mozambique
National Service of Popular Security (SNASP)

Nicaragua
Dirección General de Seguridad del Estado (DGSE) (Directorate-General of State Security)
Ministerio de Seguridad Interior (MSI) (Ministry of Internal Security)

Nigeria
Nigerian Security Organization (NSO)

Ottoman Empire
 Teşkilât-ı Mahsusa (Special Organization)

Paraguay
Pyraguës (Between 1814 and 1840, nicknamed Hairy Feet by civilians)
División Técnica de Represión del Comunismo (Technical Division for the Repression of Communism), active during the El Stronato period, the single-party military dictatorship of Alfredo Stroessner
Departamento de Investigaciones de la Policía (DIPC) (Police Investigations Department), active during the El Stronato period, the single-party military dictatorship of Alfredo Stroessner

Peru
Seguridad del Estado (State Security)

Philippines
Metrocom Intelligence and Security Group, active during the rule of Ferdinand Marcos
National Intelligence and Security Authority or NISA, active during the rule of Ferdinand Marcos. Headed by Marcos' trusted military man, General Fabian Ver, who was also the commander of presidential security and in 1981, was appointed as chief of staff of the Armed Forces of the Philippines.

Poland
 Urząd Bezpieczeństwa Publicznego (UBP) (1945–1954) – Office of Public Safety, active in the Polish People's Republic
Służba Bezpieczeństwa (SB) (1956–1989) – Security Service of the Ministry of Internal Affairs), active in the Polish People's Republic

Portugal
Polícia Preventiva (Preventive Police): 1918–1919, active in the First Portuguese Republic
Polícia de Segurança do Estado (State Security Police): 1919, active in the First Portuguese Republic
Polícia de Defesa Social (Social Defense Police): 1919–1926, active in the First Portuguese Republic
Polícia de Informações (Informations Police): 1926–1931, active during the Ditadura Nacional period
Polícia de Vigilância Política e Social (Political and Social Surveillance Police): 1933, active during the Ditadura Nacional period
Polícia de Vigilância e de Defesa do Estado (State Defence and Surveillance Police): 1933–1945, active during the Estado Novo regime under the rule of António de Oliveira Salazar 
Polícia Internacional e de Defesa do Estado – PIDE (International and State Defence Police): 1945–1968, active during the Estado Novo regime under the rule of António de Oliveira Salazar
Direcção-Geral de Segurança (Directorate-General of Security): 1968–1974, active during the Estado Novo regime under the rule of Marcelo Caetano

Republic of China (Taiwan)
Taiwan Garrison Command

Roman Empire
Agentes in rebus
Frumentarii
Cohors Praetoria (SPQR) (Praetorian Guard) An ancient Roman institution in charge of the Roman Emperor's safety.

Romania
Departamentul Securităţii statului (Securitate) (Department of State Security), active in the Socialist Republic of Romania

Russian monarchy
Oprichniki (1565–1573) under Ivan the Terrible
Third Section of His Imperial Majesty's Own Chancellery (1825–1880) under Nicholas I of Russia
Separate Corps of Gendarmes (1836–1917)
Okhrana (Okhrannoye otdeleniye) (1866–1917)

Rwanda
Service Central de Renseignements (SCR) (Central Information Service)

El Salvador
Organización Democrática Nacionalista (ORDEN) (Nationalist Democratic Organization)
Frente Democrático Nacionalista (FDN) (Nationalist Democratic Front)

Singapore
Special Branch

Somalia
National Security Service, active in the Somali Democratic Republic
Hangash (Military Intelligence Unit), active in the Somali Democratic Republic
Victory Pioneers (Neighbourhood watch), active in the Somali Democratic Republic
Dhabar Jabinta (Division of military police), active in the Somali Democratic Republic
Red Berets (Presidential bodyguards), active in the Somali Democratic Republic

South Africa
Bureau of State Security (BOSS), active during the Apartheid era

Soviet Union

All-Russian Extraordinary Commission (Cheka, 1917–22)
State Political Directorate (GPU, 1922–23) 
Joint State Political Directorate (OGPU, 1923–34)
People's Commissariat for Internal Affairs (NKVD 1934–46)
Main Directorate of State Security (GUGB 1934–41)
People's Commissariat for State Security (NKGB, Feb Jul-1941/1943–46) 
Ministry for State Security (MGB, 1946–53)
Committee for State Security (KGB, 1954–91)

Spain
Servicio de Información Militar (Military Information Service), active in the Second Spanish Republic during the Spanish Civil War
 Brigada Político-Social (BPS) (Political-Social Brigade) / Brigada de Investigación Social (BIS) (Social Investigation Brigade), active in Francoist Spain
Servicio Central de Documentación (SECED) (Central Documentation Service)
 Servicio de Inteligencia de la Guardia Civil (Intelligence Service of the Civil Guard)

Turkey
 Jandarma İstihbarat ve Terörle Mücadele (JİTEM) (Gendarmerie Intelligence and Counter-Terrorism), active during the Kurdish-Turkish conflict

Uganda
Public Safety Unit
State Research Bureau

United States of America
COINTELPRO, a program of the Federal Bureau of Investigation that included operations directed against Communists, anti-Vietnam War organizers, the Civil Rights and Black Power movements, feminist organizations, anti-colonial movements, and the New Left generally, as well as operations directed against white supremacist and far-right groups (none of these programs have ever ceased).
CONUS INTEL, a program of the United States Army that investigated and engaged in counterintelligence activities against civil rights and anti-Vietnam War organizations. 
CONARC, the United States Army Continental Army Command, operated a separate program paralleling CONUS INTEL.
Mississippi State Sovereignty Commission, largely confined to the State of Mississippi to resist desegregations

Uruguay
Organismo Coordinador de Actividades Anti-Subversivas (Anti-Subversive Activities Co-ordination Organization)

Venezuela
Bolivarian Intelligence Service
Dirección General de Contrainteligencia Militar (DIM)
National Directorate of Intelligence and Prevention Services (DISIP)

South Vietnam
Social and Political Research Service (So Nghien Cuu Xa Hoi Chinh Tri) (during the regime of Ngo Dinh Diem)

Yugoslavia
Department for People's Protection (OZNA, 1944–1946), active in Democratic Federal Yugoslavia
State Security Administration (UDBA, 1946–1991), active in the Socialist Federal Republic of Yugoslavia
Counterintelligence Service (KOS, 1946–1991)
State Security Service (SDB, 1991–2002), active in the Federal Republic of Yugoslavia
Security Administration (1992–2002)

Zaire
Centre Nationale de Documentation (CND) (National Documentation Center) – 1969-early 1980s
Agence Nationale de Documentation (AND) (National Documentation Agency) – Early 1980s – August 1990
Service National d'Intelligence et de Protection (SNIP) (National Service for Intelligence and Protection) (August 1990 – May 1997)

See also 
List of fictional secret police and intelligence organizations
 List of defunct intelligence agencies
List of secret police organizations
Police
Secret police

References 

Lists of law enforcement agencies

secret police